Aberdeen Football Club are a Scottish professional association football club based in Aberdeen. They have played at their home ground, Pittodrie, since the club's formation in 1903. Aberdeen joined the Scottish Football League in 1904, and the Scottish Premier League in 1998 as well as the Scottish Professional Football League in 2013.

The club's record appearance maker is Willie Miller, who made 796 appearances between 1972 and 1990. Joe Harper is the club's record goalscorer, scoring 199 goals in major competitions during his two spells at Aberdeen.

This list encompasses the major honours won by Aberdeen, records set by the club, their managers and their players.  The player records section includes details of the club's leading goalscorers and those who have made most appearances in first-team competitions. It also records notable achievements by Aberdeen players on the international stage, and the highest transfer fees paid and received by the club. Attendance records at Pittodrie are also included in the list.

Honours

Aberdeen's first trophy was the Southern League Cup in 1946, which was won after a 3-2 win against Rangers. Their first national trophy win was the Scottish Cup in 1947. Aberdeen's first Scottish League Cup victory came in 1955.

In 1983, Aberdeen won two European trophies, the European Cup Winners' Cup and the European Super Cup. The 1980s was Aberdeen's most successful in terms of trophies won, with three league championships, four Scottish Cups and two Scottish League Cups added to the two European trophies. Aberdeen's most recent trophy win was in 2014, when they defeated Inverness Caledonian Thistle in the Scottish League Cup final.

National

League

Scottish Top Tier: (4)
Scottish First Division – 1954–55 
Scottish Premier Division – 1979–80, 1983–84, 1984–85
Runners-up (17): 1910–11, 1936–37, 1955–56, 1970–71, 1971–72, 1977–78, 1980–81, 1981–82, 1988–89, 1989–90, 1990–91, 1992–93, 1993–94, 2014–15, 2015–16, 2016–17, 2017–18

Scottish Cup 

Winners: (7)
1946–47, 1969–70, 1981–82, 1982–83, 1983–84, 1985–86, 1989–90
Runners-up (9): 1936–37, 1952–53, 1953–54, 1958–59, 1966–67, 1977–78, 1992–93, 1999–00, 2016–17

Scottish League Cup
Winners: (6)
1955–56, 1976–77, 1985–86, 1989–90, 1995–96, 2013–14
Runners-up (9): 1946–47, 1978–79, 1979–80, 1987–88, 1988–89, 1992–93, 1999–00, 2016–17, 2018–19

European
UEFA Cup Winners' Cup: 1
1982–83
Semi-final: 1983–84
UEFA Super Cup: 1
1983

Regional 
Aberdeenshire Cup (36): 1903–04, 1904–05, 1906–07, 1907–08, 1908–09, 1909–10, 1911–12, 1912–13, 1913–14, 1914–15, 1919–20, 1920–21, 1921–22, 1922–23, 1923–24, 1924–25, 1925–26, 1926–27, 1927–28, 1928–29, 1929–30, 1930–31, 1931–32, 1932–33, 1933–34, 1980–81, 1981–82, 1982–83, 1987–88, 1989–90, 1990–91, 1992–93, 1997–98, 2002–03, 2003–04, 2004–05
Aberdeenshire and District League (7): 1919–20, 1920–21, 1925–26, 1926–27, 1927–28, 1928–29, 1947–48
Dewar Shield (17): 1906–07, 1908–09, 1912–13, 1914–15, 1926–27, 1928–29, 1930–31, 1931–32, 1932–33, 1933–34, 1935–36, 1936–37, 1939–40, 1945–46, 1949–50, 1950–51 (shared), 1951-52 (shared)
Fleming Charity Shield (13): 1903–04, 1904–05, 1905–06, 1906–07, 1907–08, 1908–09, 1909–10, 1910–11, 1911–12, 1912–13, 1913–14, 1921–22, 1922–23
High Cup: 1907–08
Highland League: 1912–13, 1924–25 (won by Aberdeen A)
Northern League: 1905–06, 1910–11 (won by Aberdeen A)
Rhodesia Cup: 1904–05
Robertson Cup: 1910–11 (shared), 1915–16 (shared)
Caledonia Trophy: 1947–48, 1948–49, 1949–50

Wartime
North Eastern League (4): 1942–43 (winter), 1942–43 (spring), 1943–44 (spring), 1944–45 (spring)
North Eastern League Cup/Mitchell Cup (5): 1941–42 (winter), 1942–43 (winter), 1942–43 (spring), 1944–45 (winter), 1944–45 (spring)
Southern League Cup: 1945–46

Other cups
Drybrough Cup: 1971–72, 1980–81
Summer Cup: Runners-up 1963–64

Youth
Scottish Youth League: 1998–99, 2014–15
Scottish Youth Cup: 1984–85, 1985–86, 2000–01

Player records

Appearances
Most appearances in all major competitions: Willie Miller, 796
Most League appearances: Willie Miller, 561
Most Scottish Cup appearances: Alex McLeish, 68
Most League Cup appearances: Willie Miller, 109
Most European appearances: Willie Miller, 61
Youngest first-team player: Dean Campbell, 16 years, 51 days (against Celtic on 12 May 2017)

Top 50 most appearances
Competitive, professional matches only, up to the end of the 2021/22 season.

Top 10 non-UK appearances
Competitive, professional matches only, up to the end of the 2021/22 season.

Goalscorers
 Most goals scored: Joe Harper, 199
 Most goals scored in League: Joe Harper, 125
 Most goals scored in Scottish Cup: Benny Yorston, 23
 Most goals scored in Scottish League Cup:Joe Harper, 51
 Most goals scored in Europe: Mark McGhee, 14
 Most goals scored in a season: Benny Yorston, 46, 1929–30
 Most league goals in a season: Benny Yorston, 38, 1929–30

Top 50 goalscorers
Competitive, professional matches only, up to the end of the 2021/22 season. Matches played appear in brackets.

Top 10 non-UK goalscorers
Competitive, professional matches only, up to the end of the 2021/22 season. Matches played appear in brackets.

International caps
 First capped: Charlie O'Hagan for Ireland in 1907.
 First capped for Scotland: Willie Lennie in 1908
 Most caps as an Aberdeen player: Alex McLeish - 77 caps for Scotland.
 First Aberdeen player to play at a World Cup: Fred Martin (for Scotland against Austria, 16 June 1954)

Transfers
 Highest Transfer fee received: £4,200,000: Calvin Ramsay to Liverpool June 2022
 Highest Transfer fee paid: £1,000,000: Paul Bernard from Oldham Athletic September 1995

Club records

Matches

Firsts
 First match (of the reformed club): vs. Stenhousemuir, Drew 1–1, Northern League, Pittodrie, (H), 15 August 1903
 First League Match: vs. Falkirk, Lost 2–1, Scottish Division Two, Pittodrie, (H), 20 August 1904
 First Scottish Cup Match: vs. Alloa Athletic, Lost 2–1, Scottish Cup, Recreation Park, (A), 23 January 1905
 First League Cup Match: vs. Falkirk, Won 4–3, Scottish League Cup, Pittodrie, (H), 21 September 1946
 First European Match: vs. KR Reykjavík, Won 10–0, European Cup Winners' Cup, Pittodrie, (H), 6 September 1967

Wins
 Record win (all competitions):
 13–0 against Peterhead in Scottish Cup 3rd Round at Pittodrie on 10 February 1923 
 Record League win:
10–0 against Raith Rovers in Scottish Division One at Pittodrie on 13 October 1962 
 Record Scottish Cup win:
 13–0 against Peterhead in Scottish Cup 3rd Round at Pittodrie on 10 February 1923 
 Record League Cup win: 
 9–0 against Queen of the South in Scottish League Cup Group Stages at Pittodrie on 13 September 1947 
 9–0 against Raith Rovers in Scottish League Cup 2nd Round 1st Leg at Pittodrie on 24 August 1983
 Record European win:
10–0 against KR Reykjavík in European Cup Winners' Cup 1st Round 1st Leg at Pittodrie on 6 September 1967

Defeats
 Record defeat (all competitions): 
 0–9 against Celtic in Scottish Premier League at Celtic Park on 6 November 2010
 Record League defeat:
 0–9 against Celtic in Scottish Premier League at Celtic Park on 6 November 2010
 Record Scottish Cup defeat:
 1–6 against Rangers in Scottish Cup Semi Final at Celtic Park on 22 March 1969 
 Record League Cup defeat: 
 0–6 against Dundee in Scottish League Cup Group Stages at Dens Park on 3 September 1960
 Record European defeat:
 0–4 against Liverpool in European Cup 2nd Round 2nd Leg at Anfield on 5 November 1980
 1–5 against Bayern Munich in UEFA Cup Round of 32 2nd Leg at Allianz Arena on 21 February 2008
 1–5 against Sigma Olomouc in Europa League 3rd Qual. Round at Pittodrie on 30 July 2009

Attendances
Record attendance: 147,365 against Celtic, lost 2-1, 1937 Scottish Cup Final, Hampden Park, (N), 24 April 1937 (record for a club football match in Europe)
 Highest home attendance: 45,061 vs Hearts, Scottish Cup Quarter-final, 13 March 1954
 Highest average home attendance: 24,200, 1948–49 (15 matches)

See also
Aberdeen F.C. in European football
History of Aberdeen F.C.
List of Aberdeen F.C. seasons

References

Records
Aberdeen
Records